Lithoseopsis hellmani is a species of tropical barklouse in the family Amphientomidae. It is found in Central America and North America.

References

Troctomorpha
Articles created by Qbugbot
Insects described in 1956